The SAI KZ II was a sport aircraft built in Denmark in 1937, produced in three major versions before and after the Second World War.

Design and development
In its original form, designated the Kupé (Danish: "Coupé") it was a low-wing cantilever monoplane of conventional design with fixed tailwheel undercarriage and two seats side by side under an enclosed canopy. The fuselage structure was of steel tube, skinned in plywood and fabric, and the wings were wooden with plywood covering and could be folded back along the fuselage for transport and storage.

This was followed by the aerobatic KZ II Sport with a revised fuselage design, placing the two seats in separate open cockpits in tandem, and a dedicated military trainer version along the same lines, the KZ II Træner ("Trainer"). This latter type was first produced in 1946, as a step towards rebuilding Denmark's air force after the war. They remained in service until 1955, when nine examples were sold into private hands.

In 2008, an example of each variant (including the sole extant KZ II Sport) is preserved in the Danmarks Flymuseum.

Variants
 KZ II Kupé - original version with side-by-side seating under an enclosed canopy and de Havilland Gipsy Minor or Cirrus Minor engine (14 built)
 KZ II Sport - aerobatic version with tandem seating in open cockpits and  Hirth 504A engine (16 built)
 KZ II Træner - military trainer version similar to KZ II Sport with de Havilland Gipsy Major engine (15 built)

Operators

 Danish Navy - ordered 4 × KZ II Sport, but these were confiscated by Germany before delivery
 Danish Air Force - 15 × KZ II Træner operated between 1946 and 1955

Specifications (KZ II Træner)

See also

References

 
 
 Danmarks Flymuseum page on the KZ II Kupé (in Danish)
 Danmarks Flymuseum page on the KZ II Sport (in Danish)
 Danmarks Flymuseum page on the KZ II Træner (in Danish)
 Уголок неба

Specific

Skandinavisk Aero Industri aircraft
1930s Danish sport aircraft
Low-wing aircraft
Single-engined tractor aircraft
Aircraft first flown in 1937